Lloyd Eugene "Dob" Grow (July 23, 1903 – June 10, 1979) was an American football and basketball coach. He served as the head football coach at Henderson State Teachers College—now known as Henderson State University—in Arkadelphia, Arkansas in 1939 and Kalamazoo College in Kalamazoo, Michigan from 1949 to 1952, compiling a career college football coaching record of 16–24–2. Grow was an alumnus of Northeastern Oklahoma A&M College and the University of Nebraska, where he received his Bachelor of Arts. Grow was an assistant at the University of Wyoming.

Coaching career
Grow was the head football coach at Kalamazoo College in Kalamazoo, Michigan.  He held that position for four seasons, from 1949 until 1952. His coaching record at Kalamazoo was 12–20–1.

Death
Grow died in June 1979. An obituary appeared in the Sports News on June 30, 1979.

Head coaching record

Football

References

External links
 

1903 births
1979 deaths
American football centers
Basketball coaches from Nebraska
Henderson State Reddies football coaches
Kalamazoo Hornets football coaches
Kalamazoo Hornets men's basketball coaches
Nebraska Cornhuskers football players
Wyoming Cowboys football coaches
Northeastern Oklahoma A&M College alumni
People from Sherman County, Nebraska
Players of American football from Nebraska